The 2012 Australian GT Championship was a CAMS sanctioned national motor racing championship open to GT style closed production based sports cars which were either approved by the FIA for GT3 competition or approved by CAMS as Australian GTs.

It was the 16th Australian GT Championship, the twelfth to be contested over a multi-event championship, and the eighth to be contested since the title was revived in 2005.

The series had a new owner for 2012, with seasoned GT racer Tony Quinn taking over the series towards the end of the 2011 season.

The championship was won by Klark Quinn driving a Porsche 911 GT3-R.

Divisions
After consolidation from three divisions to two in 2011, the 2012 series saw an expansion to four divisions, based on vehicle eligibility and specification.

 GT Championship – for FIA GT3 specification vehicles
 GT Trophy – for older specification FIA GT3 vehicles
 GT Challenge – for cars that no longer fit within the GT Championship and Trophy divisions
 GT Sports – for GT4 specification cars

Teams and drivers

The following teams and drivers contested the 2012 Australian GT Championship.

Race calendar
The championship was contested over a seven round series.

Season summary (as at the end of Round 3)
After the first three rounds of the series Porsche driver Klark Quinn leads the Championship Division by just one point over Mercedes driver Peter Hackett. Quinn started the series well winning both races at the Adelaide Street Circuit while Hackett won both races at Round 3 at Winton as well as taking Race 1 at Round 2 Phillip Island. Dodge Viper driver Greg Crick took the other win in the wet at Phillip Island where Hackett's team mate James Brock crashed. Brock had been second but now sits fifth having driven a Mosler at Winton while his Mercedes was repaired. Crick is fourth while Ferrari driver Peter Edwards sits third, thanks to the help of co-drivers Allan Simonsen, John Bowe and Jonny Reid.

Lamborghini drivers dominate the Trophy class with Andrew Taplin leading the co-driving pair of Dean Koutsoumidis and Andrew McInnes by six points with Porsche driver Jordan Ormsby third.

Porsche driver Jan Jinadasa, the only driver to attend all three rounds, leads Challenge over fellow Porsche driver Peter Boylan and Ferrari driver Brenton Griguol.

Darren Berry's Ginetta has been the only entrant in the Sports class.

Points system
Points were awarded in each division for each qualifying session and each race at each round according to the following table. Points were allocated according to positions attained in each division rather than for outright positions.

Championship results
The 2012 winners were:
 GT Championship – Klark Quinn (Porsche GT3-R) 
 GT Trophy – Koutsoumidis & McInnes (Lamborghini Gallardo GT3) 
 GT Challenge – Jan Jinadasa (Porsche 997 GT3 Cup Car) 
 GT Sports – Darren Berry (Ginetta G50 GT4)

Results

2012 Australian Tourist Trophy
The 2012 Australian Tourist Trophy was awarded by the Confederation of Australian Motor Sport to the driver accumulating the highest aggregate points total from the  Phillip Island and Sydney Motorsport Park rounds of the Australian GT Championship. The title, which was the 23rd Australian Tourist Trophy, was won by Peter Hackett driving a Mercedes-Benz SLS AMG GT3.

References

External links
 www.australiangt.com.au, as archived at web.archive.org on 14 January 2013
 Natsoft Race Results

Australian GT Championship
GT Championship